Lasse is a male Scandinavian given name. 

Lasse may also refer to:

Lasse, Maine-et-Loire, France, a commune
Lasse, Pyrénées-Atlantiques, France, a commune 
Dick Lasse (born 1935), American former National Football League player and former college football coach
Kurt Lasse (1918–1941), German World War II Luftwaffe ace